Leopoldo Briola (born 23 December 1918, date of death unknown) was an Argentine weightlifter. He competed in the men's heavyweight event at the 1948 Summer Olympics.

References

External links
 

1918 births
Year of death missing
Argentine male weightlifters
Olympic weightlifters of Argentina
Weightlifters at the 1948 Summer Olympics
Place of birth missing
20th-century Argentine people